Jani Kauppila (born 16 January 1980, Oulu) is a retired Finnish footballer who played as a midfielder.

Kauppila joined Rangers in January 2001. He made his debut as a sub against Hearts on 3 March 2001, coming on in the 23rd minute before being substituted off at half-time. After four appearances in total Kauppila left Rangers in 2002. He won the Finland Cup with his side FC Haka in 2005.

References

Finnish footballers
Finnish expatriate footballers
Veikkausliiga players
FC Haka players
Rangers F.C. players
AC Oulu players
Living people
1980 births
Expatriate footballers in Scotland
Scottish Premier League players
Sportspeople from Oulu
Association football midfielders
Oulun Luistinseura players